Megistotherium is an extinct genus of hyainailourid hyaenodonts from paraphyletic subfamily Hyainailourinae that lived in Africa.

Etymology

Description
Megistotherium osteothlastes is the only known species from this genus, and it was a large hyainailourid that lived during the early Miocene. Its remains have been found in the Ngorora and Muruyur Formations of Kenya, Egypt, Namibia, Uganda and Libya. Named by Robert Savage in 1973, Megistotherium is one of the largest known hyaenodonts. The carnassial teeth of Megistotherium (like those of other hyaenodonts) were the upper first molars, and overlapped with their lower molar counterparts like scissors to form a formidable and powerful shearing action.

Paleoecology
The land that is now the Sahara desert was much more fertile in the Miocene. A considerable amount of it was grassland and rainfall was plentiful. Lakes and ponds provided water for large fauna, which provided Megistotherium and other predators with an ample supply of prey. Large hyaenodontids like this one could have originally evolved as specialized predators or scavengers of large African herbivores. Gomphothere bones have been found with its fossils, indicating that Megistotherium may have hunted them for food.

Classification and phylogeny

Taxonomic history
The family Hyainailouridae comprised a diverse group of hyaenodont predators that were most successful during the Eocene before being possibly ecologically displaced by the order Carnivora during the late Oligocene. Megistotherium emerged in the Miocene towards the end of the hyaenodonts' flourishing; it was a part of a radiation of African hyaenodontids that occurred at that time. Hyainailouros sulzeri is very closely related to Megistotherium, extremely similar in size, structure and ratios - with a long tail, short limbs and robust body. Other authorities have suggested that Megistotherium is actually a junior synonym of Hyainailouros sulzeri, which is known by an almost complete skeleton, among other remains, and has been found in Europe, Asia and Namibia, and therefore comes from the same localities.

Phylogeny
The phylogenetic relationships of genus Megistotherium are shown in the following cladogram:

See also
 Mammal classification
 Hyainailourinae

References

 Domning, D. P. (1978.) "Sirenia." Evolution of African Mammals. pp. 573–581.
 Egi, Naoko (2001.) "Body Mass Estimates in Extinct Mammals from Limb Bone Dimensions: the Case of North American Hyaenodontids." Palaeontology. Vol. 44, Issue 3, Page 497.
 Leakey, L. S. B. and R. J. G. Savage (Editors) (1976.) "Fossil Vertebrates of Africa." Academic Press Inc., U.S. .

Hyaenodonts
Miocene mammals of Africa
Fossil taxa described in 1973
Prehistoric placental genera